Mandala is a Brazilian telenovela produced and broadcast by TV Globo. It premiered on 12 October 1987 and ended on 14 May 1988, with a total of 185 episodes. It's the thirty eighth "novela das oito" to be aired on the timeslot. It is created by Dias Gomes and directed by Ricardo Waddington.

Cast 
 Vera Fischer - Jocasta Silveira
 Nuno Leal Maia - Tony Carrado 
 Lúcia Veríssimo - Letícia
 Carlos Augusto Strazzer - Argemiro
 Felipe Camargo - Édipo Junqueira 
 Gianfrancesco Guarnieri - Túlio Silveira
 Célia Helena - Ceres Silveira
 Gracindo Júnior - Creonte Silveira
 Raul Cortez - Pedro Bergman
 Oswaldo Loureiro - Américo Junqueira
 Ângela Leal - Mercedes Junqueira
 Imara Reis - Vera
 Osmar Prado - Gerson Silveira
 Bia Seidl - Mariana
 Paulo Gracindo - Vovô Pepê (Petronílio Silveira)
 Yara Côrtes - D. Conchita
 Ilka Soares - Lena
 Milton Gonçalves - Apolinário Santana
 Aída Leiner - Eurídice Barbosa Santana
 Grande Otelo - Jonas Caetano Barbosa
 Ruth de Souza - Zezé (Maria José Barbosa)
 Aracy Cardoso - Flora
 Betina Viany - Ondina (Madame Lorrain)
 Jayme Periard - Miguel
 Jandir Ferrari - Toninho Carrado
 Betty Erthal - Dalva
 Lupe Gigliotti - Dona Severina
 Fafy Siqueira - Jupira
 Carlos Kroeber - Dr. Henrique
 Reynaldo Gonzaga - Nando (Fernando)
 Chico Diaz - Rafael
 Maria Alves - Carmem Barbosa Santana
 Marcos Breda - Hans
  Antônio Grassi - Zé Mário
 Chico Tenreiro - Pinto
 Luiz Magnelli - Soneca
 Felipe Martins - Wanderley
 Tony Ferreira
 Waldir Onofre
 Giulia Gam - Jocasta (young)
 Taumaturgo Ferreira - Laio Lunardo (young)
 Suzana Faini - Glória Lunardo (Laio's mother)
 Walmor Chagas - Michel Lunardo
 Marco Antônio Pâmio - Argemiro
 Marcos Palmeira - Creonte
 Deborah Evelyn - Vera (young)
 Lília Cabral - Lena
 Mauro Mendonça - Adroaldo (Vera's father)
 Beatriz Lyra - Estela (Vera's mother)
 Daniel Dantas - Otávio
 Paulo César Pereio - Capitão (smuggler)
 Danton Mello - Gerson
 Marina Miranda - Jocasta's family maid
   Carlos Wilson - Pai-de-santo who helps Laio
   Luiz Sérgio Lima e Silva - Director of Brazilian Communist Party
   Daniel Trindade - Jorge
   Ana Luiza Follay - Laio's secretary
 Júlio Levy - Michel's butler
   Schulamith Yaari - Nurse in the maternity hospital where Édipo was born
 Perry Salles - Laio Lunardo
 Marcelo Picchi - Chris
 Rubens Corrêa - Psychoanalyst of Édipo
 Yara Amaral - Rafael's mother
 Castro Gonzaga - Gilberto
 Francisco Milani - Efigênio
 Breno Bonin - Luís
   Gisela Arnoud - Luciana
   Esmeralda Hannah - Marli
 Rejane Goulart - Beatriz
 Walney Costa - Sinésio
   Luciana Fontenelli - Isabel
   Anna Gallo - Marlucy
   Cleonir dos Santos - Fiapo
   Theresa Mascarenhas - Marcene
   Christovam Netto - Tico-Tico
   Paulo Camargo - Marcos

References

External links 
 

TV Globo telenovelas
1987 telenovelas
Brazilian telenovelas
1987 Brazilian television series debuts
1988 Brazilian television series endings
Portuguese-language telenovelas
Works based on Oedipus Rex